Fan Xuefei (born 9 October 1990) is a Chinese lightweight rower.

At the 2006 World Rowing Championships at Dorney Lake, Eton, Great Britain, she won a gold medal in the lightweight women's quadruple sculls.

References

External links 
 
 

Chinese female rowers
1990 births
Living people
World Rowing Championships medalists for China